The University Museum is a historic building that houses several museums belonging to Harvard University.  The building is located at 24-28 Oxford Street and 11-25 Divinity Avenue in Cambridge, Massachusetts.  It houses both the Harvard Museum of Natural History at 26 Oxford Street, and the Peabody Museum of Archaeology and Ethnology at 11 Divinity Avenue, as well as several departments of Harvard's Museum of Comparative Zoology and the Mineralogical & Geological Museum.

The building is a large U-shaped brick structure, six stories high, whose oldest portion dates to 1859.  This section was built to house the Museum of Comparative Zoology; it was added onto in 1876 to provide space for the Peabody Museum, and was expanded several other times between then and 1913.  The building is basically Italian Renaissance in its styling.

The building was listed on the National Register of Historic Places in 1986.

See also
National Register of Historic Places listings in Cambridge, Massachusetts

References

Harvard University buildings
Harvard University museums
School buildings completed in 1859
National Register of Historic Places in Cambridge, Massachusetts
University and college buildings on the National Register of Historic Places in Massachusetts
1889 establishments in Massachusetts
Brick buildings and structures
1850s architecture in the United States
Renaissance Revival architecture in Massachusetts